"Southern Sun" is a song recorded by Australian indie rock band Boy & Bear and released in June 2013 as the lead single from their second studio album Harlequin Dream (2013). The song peaked at number 63 on the ARIA Charts.

The song was launched on triple J and the band said the song was inspired by the works of Bruce Springsteen, Fleetwood Mac and Paul Simon.

The band performed the song on Conan in July 2014.

Charts

Certification

References

2013 songs
2013 singles
Boy & Bear songs